Mamita may refer to:

Arts
Mamitas, 2011 film with E.J. Bonilla 
"Mamita", tango sung by Carlos Gardel lyrics by Francisco Bohigas and words by Ángel Félix Danesi, 1929
"Mamita" (song), a 2017 song by CNCO

Festival
Mamita (dance), dance of Tripura at the Mamita festival
Mamita Festival, the harvest festival of the Tripuri people

People
Walter Calderón (born 1977), Ecuadorian football player
Mamita Fox (born 1943), Curaçao-born writer
The Hot & Spicy Mamitas, LA comedy group

Fictional
Mamita, played by Pilita Corrales, in Lagot Ka, Isusumbong Kita
Mamita in Gigi (musical)
Mamita, character in web series Common Sense Mamita Lydia Nicole
Mamita Yunai, 1940 novel by Carlos Luis Fallas

Other
Mamita (originally from marmita) in Berber cuisine, pan full with different kinds of vegetables, meat and spices